Cool 97.5 (DWLY 97.5 MHz) is an FM station owned and operated by UBC Media (Love Radio Network). Its studios and transmitter are located at #43, 1st Rd., Brgy. Quezon Hill Proper, Baguio.

Established in 1981, it was formerly owned Central Development Communications and carried the tagline Your Love Radio until 1997, when UBC Media acquired the station.

References

External links
Cool 97.5 Website
Cool 97.5 FB Page

Radio stations in Baguio
Christian radio stations in the Philippines
Radio stations established in 1981